The Iowa Sports Hall of Fame, sponsored by the Des Moines Register, honors outstanding athletes and sports contributors.  To be eligible, members must have either been born in Iowa or gained prominence while competing for a college or university in Iowa.

Leighton Housh, former executive sports editor of the Register, established the Hall of Fame in 1951.  Twenty-four athletes were chosen in the inaugural class.  The Hall of Fame now includes more than 170 athletes from 20 sports.  Inductees are chosen by veteran members of the Register's sports department.

Partial list of inductees

Football

 1951 - Jay Berwanger
 1951 - Aubrey Devine
 1951 - Nile Kinnick
 1951 - Elmer Layden
 1951 - Duke Slater
 1956 - Clyde Williams
 1958 - Gordon Locke
 1959 - Billy Edson
 1961 - Joe Laws
 1962 - Eddie Anderson
 1970 - Johnny Bright
 1971 - Cal Jones
 1973 - Willis Glassgow
 1975 - Emlen Tunnell
 1976 - Randy Duncan
 1977 - Alex Karras
 1980 - Don Perkins
 1983 - Mike Enich
 1985 - Paul Krause
 1986 - Ed Podolak
 1987 - Wally Hilgenberg
 1989 - Forest Evashevski
 1998 - Roger Craig
 1999 - Matt Blair
 2000 - Larry Station
 2001 - Chuck Long
 2002 - Ken Ploen
 2002 - Chad Hennings
 2003 - Reggie Roby
 2006 - Andre Tippett
 2012 - Marv Levy
 2013 - Tavian Banks
 2014 - Tim Dwight

Basketball
 1951 - Murray Wier
 1980 - Carl Cain
 1983 - Don Nelson
 1990 - Fred Brown
 1993 - John Johnson
 1994 - Ronnie Lester
 1999 - Bobby Hansen

Baseball

 1951 - "Cap" Anson
 1951 - Fred Clarke
 1951 - "Red" Faber
 1951 - Bob Feller
 1952 - "Dazzy" Vance
 1954 - Dave Bancroft
 1956 - "Jack" Coombs
 1961 - "Bing" Miller
 1962 - Hank Severeid
 1963 - Earl Whitehill
 1965 - Hal Trosky
 1968 - Cal McVey
 1970 - George Stone, batting champion
 1976 - George Pipgras
 1984 - Chet Brewer
 1988 - Jack Dittmer
 2000 - Mike Boddicker

Other sports

 1951 - "Farmer" Burns, wrestling
 1951 - Sabin Carr, track and field
 1951 - Welker Cochran, billiards
 1951 - Frank Gotch, wrestling
 1951 - George Saling, track and field
 1951 - Morgan Taylor, track and field
 1952 - Earl Caddock, wrestling
 1959 - Harris Coggeshall, tennis
 1963 - Ray Conger, track and field
 1972 - Garfield Wood, speedboat racing
 1972 - Jack Fleck, golf
 1973 - Frank Wykoff, track and field
 1981 - Doreen Wilber, archery
 1981 - Dan Gable, wrestling
 1982 - Bruce Jenner, track and field
 1990 - "Tiny" Lund, auto racing
 1993 - Francis Cretzmeyer, track and field
 1993 - Chris Taylor, wrestling
 1994 - Nawal El Moutawakel, track and field
 1997 - Judy Kimball, golf
 2003 - Danny Harris, track
 2012 - Cael Sanderson, wrestling

See also
Glen Brand Wrestling Hall of Fame of Iowa
Iowa State University Athletics Hall of Fame
University of Iowa Athletics Hall of Fame

External links
Iowa Sports Hall of Fame webpage (DesMoinesRegister.com)

All-sports halls of fame
State sports halls of fame in the United States
Halls of fame in Iowa
Sports museums in Iowa
Sports in Iowa
Awards established in 1951